is a Japanese actor and model whose work has included stage, television and film roles. He is best known as the character Takatora Kureshima / Kamen Rider Zangetsu / Kamen Rider Zangetsu Shin in the Kamen Rider series Kamen Rider Gaim. He is currently affiliated with the Japan Music Entertainment agency.

Career
Kubota debuted as a magazine model in 2002 after being scouted in Harajuku. In 2007 he made his theatrical debut as Hal Kurabayashi in the stage play Switch, based on the manga of the same name. Also in the same year he got small roles in TV series such as Oniyome Nikki and Jotei, as well as a brief appearance in Kamen Rider: The Next. A year later he got the part of Keigo Atobe in the stage play Prince of Tennis Musical. In 2009 he starred in the stage adaptation of Capcom's video game Sengoku Basara as Date Masamune. After playing the character for four years, he transitioned to a broader career in films and TV.
 
In 2010, Kubota got his first main role in the movie Gachinko Kenka Joto. On January 31, 2012, he left his agency of two years, Riseki Agency Co., Ltd., for personal reasons. After freelancing for ten months, he joined Japan Music Entertainment at the end of November 2012. In 2013, he was given the role of Takatora Kureshima/Kamen Rider Zangetsu in the tokusatsu series  Kamen Rider Gaim (2013–14). Since then, he has appeared in various TV shows and movies, including Shinjuku Swan, and in V-Cinema films. He has played a wide range of characters, from geeks to killers, although he has played mostly antagonist and rival roles. He claimed to prefer playing bad guys and dark heroes.

He is a fan and avid supporter of the local Hiratsuka soccer team Shonan Bellmare, and in April 2015 was appointed to Berusapo Public Relations Office as General Manager of Shonan Living Newspaper that supported the team's activities.

In 2018 he returned to the theater, appearing in the stage plays Gantz: L and Hachioji Zombies, the latter alongside Kenjiro Yamashita from Sandaime J Soul Brothers. In 2019 he reprised his role as Takatora Kureshima/Kamen Rider Zangetsu in the stage play Kamen Rider Zangetsu - Gaim Gaiden.

In addition to acting roles, Kubota has participated in a number of TV variety shows. He was the Monday host of TV Kanagawa's information programme Neko no Hitai Hodo Wide from April 2019 to March 2020. He also directed a promotional video for the stage play Psycho-Pass: Chapter 1 - Crime Coefficient.

On September 30, 2020, he officially launched his YouTube channel "久保田悠来の悠給休暇 (Yuki Kubota's Paid Vacation)" which to date primarily posts Let's Play videos of multiplayer online games.

In May 2021, he had a minor role as a radio staff named Shinomiya on the NHK drama Ochoyan and made a good impression on viewers that the name "Shinomiya-san" became trending on Japanese Twitter.

In January 2022, he made his directorial debut for the 2022 version of Basara stage play.

Personal life
Kubota is the younger of two brothers. His hobbies include sports, watching movies, driving and hitchhiking. He is skilled in soccer, swimming and sword fighting. As a soccer enthusiast, he visited South Africa to support Japan's national team in the 2010 World Cup.

He has an easygoing personality and often cracks jokes during interviews. He loves to make his co-stars laugh, to make their working atmosphere more fun. Kubota stated that he was nothing like the character Takatora Kureshima he portrayed in the series Kamen Rider Gaim.

Filmography

TV shows

Films

Theatrical Performances

References

External links
 Official profile at Japan Music Entertainment (in Japanese)
 Yuki Kubota (@yuk1_kbt) - Twitter (in Japanese)
 Yuki Kubota (@yuki_kubota.0615) - Instagram (in Japanese)
 Yuki Kubota Official Blog - Ameba Blog (in Japanese)
 久保田悠来 - Japanese Wikipedia
 Kubota Yūki Profile - Natalie (in Japanese)

1981 births
Living people
Japanese male models
Male actors from Kanagawa Prefecture
People from Hiratsuka, Kanagawa
Kamen Rider